This is a list of all the characters that have appeared in the animated science-fiction/sitcom series Clone High (2002–2003). The series was created by the duo Phil Lord and Chris Miller with Bill Lawrence. It still occasionally airs reruns on Teletoon and was briefly aired by MTV and MTV2 in 2003.

Development 
According to co-creator Miller the reason for putting historical figures in a school setting was that "We chose these characters because they're sort of mythic figures, even people with a very limited knowledge of history have some preconceived ideas about them, which is part of the fun." Lord adds, "The point of the whole show is that these people are not living up to their genetic forebears." Lord and Miller also explained that the development of the character of Gandhi as a "party animal" was because they researched that the young Gandhi was "immature" and "into partying" before witnessing the suffering in South Africa. Another was the reason why they introduced Ponce De León so late in the show, as a parody of how Beverly Hills, 90210 would bring in characters that were never seen before and then kill them off in a melodramatic fashion.

Main characters

Abe Lincoln 
Abe Lincoln (voiced by Will Forte) is the clone of Abraham Lincoln, the 16th President of the United States. He is the main protagonist of the series, and most of the episodes are seen through his point of view. Abe is an average, awkward, naive, shy, clumsy yet kind teenager who feels he is struggling to live up to the legacy of Abraham Lincoln.

He has been friends with Gandhi since they were babies and also good friends with Joan. Throughout season one Abe desperately pursued Cleopatra, his love interest; at first she used him but he had eventually won her love and becomes her boyfriend starting at the end of the episode Sleep of Faith in which she agreed to go out with him after he won a drag race (despite the fact Cleo ditched him to be with JFK), they did not start a real relationship until the episode Plane Crazy.

Abe is very skinny and physically weak to complement his weak-willed and indecisive nature and he is claimed to weigh only 104 pounds despite being one of the tallest students in the school. He is often seen to fall into peer pressure despite his moral values. Though intelligent, he is very unaware when it comes to other people's feelings, as he regularly insulted his friend Joan without even realizing it. He has a bitter rivalry with JFK, mostly involving his attempts to win over Cleopatra and a possible joke to one president being Republican and the other Democrat. Another reason for their rivalry is because JFK is secretly angry over how Abe treats Joan on a daily basis in his attempt to win Cleopatra over.

He is unaware that his best friend Joan of Arc is in love with him, and even when she makes advances upon him or professes her love, he seems obstinately stuck in viewing her as a platonic friend. In the series finale, Abe realizes his feelings for Joan are more than platonic. However, this was only after Cleopatra had given her an involuntary make-over for the prom and the anger he feels when he finds Joan with JFK. Before, Abe was oblivious to the fact that Cleo is attempting to drive a wedge between him and Joan and Gandhi, who she views as being detrimental to her image. When alone with Cleo, he found himself thinking about Joan more. Eventually, Abe realizes her true nature in driving away his friends and sees Cleo for the shallow person she is inside. After ending his relationship with Cleo, he rushes to Joan's house to tell her the truth of his feelings for her. By the time he got there to tell her, Abe discovers to his dismay that Joan has moved on and is in a relationship with JFK.

He is captain of the basketball team because he is the tallest guy at school and on the cross country team though it is clear he lacks athleticism, and he is the president of the anti-drug club. His famous catchphrase is "Dinger!" often said out of great excitement or frustration.

Abe is usually seen wearing a white T-shirt with a blue collar and blue sleeves, long, baggy cargo jeans and sneakers. He is very tall, skinny and gangly. He has messy brown hair and a scruffy black chin-strap beard (without a mustache) and a mole on his left cheek.

The Lego Movie, directed by show creators Phil Lord and Christopher Miller, references Clone High by casting Forte as the voice of Lego Abe Lincoln. Forte also voices Abe Lincoln in America: The Motion Picture, produced by Lord and Miller.

Joan of Arc 
Joan of Arc (voiced by Nicole Sullivan) is the clone of Jeanne d'Arc, the devout 15th century French militant. She is Abe's closest friend and is obviously in love with him (everyone knows it except Abe himself), though his constant ignorance of this causes her a lot of frustration.

In the episode ADD: The Last D Stands for Disorder Joan admits to being a "goth" and has a very moody, cynical, aloof, sarcastic and angst-ridden personality. She has a tendency to erupt melodramatically into tears, usually when Abe ignores her advances or scores with Cleopatra. She hates Cleopatra considering her to be a bimbo and a snob but develops a special hatred when Cleo starts dating Abe and when she is forced to live with Cleo because her house burnt down. Joan prefers to confide in various characters such as Mr. Butlertron, Gandhi, and Jesus Cristo when she needs emotional support, though she also frequently allows Abe to obliviously confide in her regarding his infatuation with Cleo and their amorous affairs together, much to her emotional detriment.

Joan is also very intelligent, well-read (unlike Jeanne, who was illiterate), witty and highly ethical and will speak up for what she believes in, though she is always ignored by the others as they see her as being too "outspoken". She serves as an environmentalist, a vegetarian and activist. Mated to be attractive, though she does not recognize or emphasize this and dutifully wears an orthodontic retainer. Joan has proven to appeal to the other male characters, notably JFK, who frequently harasses her. Despite this, he is secretly attracted to Joan not only because she is immune to his charms, but also he is the only one who sees more to her as a person than Abe. In the series finale, after realizing that Abe will never see her more than a friend, JFK comforts Joan and takes her to the prom with him. It's there that she realizes her feelings for JFK and sees more to him than the arrogant jock he usually displays in front of others. When Abe came over to her house to finally tell her the truth that he is in love with her, Joan has moved on and begins a relationship with JFK.

She is 16 years old. She is an agnostic (she rejects religion but is not disinclined to accepting the existence of God), which puts her at odds with the real Jeanne d'Arc who was a devout Catholic. Joan makes home-movies to express herself artistically. In the episode Makeover, Makeover, Makeover, Abe prints flyers of her to get her a date for the prom and the flyer describes her as Janeane Garofaloesque.

Joan's appearance consists of a tight black long-sleeved shirt that shows off her midriff and tight green cargo pants with black boots. She has pale skin, dark red hair, wears black eye liner, purple lipstick and a black choker around her neck. When Cleo gave her a makeover, she wore a different hairstyle, purple eye shadow and eyeliner, red lipstick, a black minidress, fishnet stockings and high heels to highlight her shapely physique.

Mahatma Gandhi 
Gandhi (voiced by Michael McDonald) is the clone of Mohandas Karamchand Gandhi, the Indian activist of the Indian Revolution. Gandhi is a hyperactive, funny, talkative, immature and rather mischievous teenager who wants to be accepted by those around him.

The reason for his often-ridiculous behavior and underachieving in academics is because he thinks he cannot live up to the legacy of Mahatma Gandhi. Though he has a somewhat likable and friendly personality, his outrageous behavior tends to offend and annoy others. He is a close friend of Abe and at times a confidant to Joan when he is not annoying her. Gandhi knows Joan likes Abe but does not say anything for Joan's privacy.

Gandhi believes he is a friend of the popular students and he especially wants to be best friends with JFK to be popular by association. He and JFK had three episodes in which they interacted, JFK admitted that he liked Gandhi as a friend in the episode Makeover, Makeover, Makeover. Gandhi also erroneously believes himself to be a ladies' man though no females are attracted to him except for Marie Curie; however, he did gain the attraction of several ladies when he briefly got a makeover as "GFK". In the series finale, Gandhi realizes his feelings for Marie and they begin a platonic relationship.

It is revealed that he used to be Cleo's foster brother for 10 years until she told her parents that he was hurting her image so he was disowned and later placed in the care of new foster parents, a stereotypical Jewish couple. He is 16 years old. He is also very short for his age much to his own dismay (even having to use a booster seat when riding in a car). His favorite movie is American Pie and according to the 2003 MTV website, he is the associate editor of the school newspaper The Tatler in which he reviews movies. Gandhi is called by various nicknames notably "G-spot" and "G-force". He also is school's mascot DNA Dan and treasurer for the Solid Gandhi Dancers.

Gandhi appearance consist of a gray short-sleeved shirt with a red stripe, blue jeans and white and red sneakers. He stands very short, is very skinny (almost to the point of looking emaciated) and has dark, swarthy skin. He is bald, wears glasses and has a black mustache and beard. He also wears a gold earring on his right ear.

His portrayal as a party animal enraged many in India, including prominent members of India's parliament.

Cleopatra Smith 
Cleopatra Smith (voiced by Christa Miller, the wife of producer Bill Lawrence) is the clone of Cleopatra VII, the last Pharaoh of Ancient Egypt. Cleopatra or "Cleo" is a beautiful, intelligent and popular student who is more commonly known as Abe's initial love interest.

She is a very selfish, snobby, cynical, vain, manipulative, pretentious and materialistic stereotypical school diva who cares only about her social image, beauty and popularity. She shows very little consideration for other people's feelings and believes she deserves to be treated like a queen among her peers. She is also an overachiever who frequently covets success to fit into her "queen bee" status. It is shown that she acts the way she does out of intense insecurity, and because she has an abusive foster mother who openly harbors contempt towards Cleo. She used to date JFK, but only because she thought he was good for her image.

She became Abe's girlfriend since the episode Plane Crazy. Cleo is portrayed as seductive, hedonistic and libidinous, as result she is sexually promiscuous and hates it when people make of fun of it, especially when Joan does it to spite her. Cleo has always been aware that Joan harbors strong feelings for Abe, and will often warn Joan to stay away from him after she and Abe began dating. When she discovered JFK's feelings for Joan, Cleo encouraged him to pursue her. In the Series Finale, when Abe was about to have sex with Cleo after prom, he begins to realize his feelings for Joan. After seeing how Cleo had been mistreating both her and Gandhi, Abe ends his relationship to her and leaves.

Despite her haughtiness and mean-spirited nature she shows a limited ability of compassion as she willingly gave Joan a makeover to help boost her confidence, she gave up some of her vanity to date the obviously unpopular student Abe Lincoln and consoled JFK when he was sad about Poncey's death.

She is 16 years old. She is captain of the cheerleading team and is the Campus Life editor for The Tatler in which she interviews students and guest stars.

Cleopatra is modeled after the ancient Egyptian hieroglyphic paintings, and thus has the same stylized and unique appearance, with prominent eye shadow, golden earrings, and dark hair and skin. Cleo wears a blue headband (sometimes a red or an orange one depending on her outfit); a milk-colored, skin-tight tank top, and black skirt. At night, she sleeps in purple lingerie as seen in the episode "Sleep of Faith: La Ru D'Awakening" and is sometimes seen wearing her cheerleading outfit in several episodes of the series, most notably "Homecoming: A Shot in D'Arc". At the prom (during the season finale), she wore a tight, revealing and seductive red dress. She also wore a bikini top with blue jean shorts while on tour with Ashley Angel on an exotic tropical island paradise in the episode "Plane Crazy: Gate Expectations". In the episode "Litter Kills: Litterally", when Cleo attended Ponce de León's funeral, she wore a black minidress.

John F. Kennedy (JFK) 
JFK (voiced by Christopher Miller) is the clone of John Fitzgerald Kennedy, the 35th President of the United States. JFK is the stereotypical popular high school jock. He is arrogant, competitive, lecherous, vain and at times dimwitted. He initially antagonized Abe and Gandhi but he later befriends them by the end of the series. However, JFK and Abe maintained a bitter rivalry, mainly due to them wanting to win Cleopatra over in the early episodes. This later changed when JFK realized that he was in love with Joan and despised the way Abe callously treated her by ignoring her feelings for him.

It is shown in episodes Episode Two: Election Blue-galoo and in Raisin the Stakes, that JFK is a very good speaker. He speaks with a thick, stereotypical, non-rhotic New England dialect and a Boston accent (a parody of the Kennedy accent) that is exaggerated and monotone for a comical effect (he usually switches "-er" suffix with "-ah" and also uses "er" and "uh" as filler which occur during mid-sentence). Despite his apparent macho exterior he is very sensitive, emotional and easily offended. JFK is known for his narcissism and his libido. He also has a penchant for using dirty jokes and innuendo. Despite this, JFK has been known to be very compassionate towards others.

Despite being accident-prone, a target of physical harm and losing his best friend Poncey to a freak accident: he does not believe in the Kennedy curse - "Nothing bad ever happens to the Kennedys" and "I'm a Kennedy, I'm not accustomed to tragedy". His plan of living up to John F. Kennedy is simply by being a womanizer and he is shown to be attractive to women, he seems not to know much about his clone father besides that he conquered the moon, as shown in a conversation with his foster parents where he says, "I thought (JFK) was a womanizing stud who conquered the Moon!". It is shown that he likes Joan, which is possibly because she is one of the few girls that is immune to his charm. Another reason why JFK likes her is because she is more compassionate and has always seen more to her than Abe did. In the series finale, he comforts Joan and takes her to the prom with his other prom dates. However, they leave him when they realize JFK and Joan are in love with each other. It is at prom and later at Joan's home that they begin a relationship, much to Abe's detest.

He is 16 years old. He mainly drives a yellow van, but drove (and destroyed) a “ducktail” C1 Corvette in the episode Sleep of Faith. He also seems to have a fear of sudden movements and friendly "hand gun" gestures as he constantly ducks, probably as a joke about the John F. Kennedy assassination. He questioned was his sexuality when he became attracted to "John Dark" (Joan in drag). He is the captain of the football and soccer teams.

JFK is seen wearing a red sweater with a white stripe in the center and on his sleeves, over a white shirt and tight khaki pants with brown loafers. He has tall, full brown hair and has a fit and muscular physique. His eyes are usually half-open but will get bigger whenever he is shocked, angered or upset. He appears as very healthy even though the real John F. Kennedy had numerous illnesses from birth (including Addison's disease).

In 2020, the show had a resurgence in popularity after multiple voice clips of JFK became popular on TikTok, such as “Nothing bad ever happens to the Kennedys!” said before he wrecks the Corvette in “Sleep of Faith,” and “watch me, hold me, sign my cast for me, WHEEL ME,” a line from “Raisin the Stakes".

Principal Scudworth 
Principal Cinnamon J. Scudworth, Ph.D. (voiced by Phil Lord) is a deluded, self-aggrandizing megalomaniac of a scientist who always wears rubber dish-gloves and is absolutely horrible at being a principal, he is always trying to betray the Secret Board of Shadowy Figures and use the clones for his own convoluted schemes, namely a clone-themed amusement park.

He is shown to have very little control over his emotions and is prone to violent outbursts. It's possible he is an atheist, as he once said to the Board of Shadowy Figures that "religion is for fools...fools and liberals". As seen in the opening theme, there is a photo of him and Mr. Butlertron salvaging the remains of Abraham Lincoln, which implies that he was the one along with Mr. B who dug the corpses of the people in the mid-1980s who would later be used in the cloning experiment.

Scudworth apparently had a son named "Brian Parker Scudworth" who he bet in a basketball game against the principal of GESH and lost, and as a result ended up getting eaten.

He is seen wearing glasses, a long white lab coat, yellow rubber gloves, and black pants and shoes. He has brown hair with a bald spot and a small soul patch under his lower lip.

Mr. Lynn Butlertron 
Mr. Lynn Butlertron (voiced by Christopher Miller) is the loyal robot servant and best friend/roommate to Scudworth who is programmed with a highly sensitive compassion protocol (a parody of Mr. Belvedere). Also known as Mr. B. He calls everyone "Wesley", a reference to the youngest child of the family Mr. Belvedere works for, Wesley Owens. Though he is usually polite and laid-back, he does have a temper which came out when had a fight with Scangrade and when he showed jealousy towards E Cybo Pooch.

Mr. Butlertron is very human-like, programmed to be sentient and possesses artificial intelligence that enables him to show human emotions, have free will, and have facial expressions. He genuinely cares for Scudworth and the students. He might have a relationship with Scudworth. An example of his strong attachment to Scudworth is the occasion of Mr. B crying when Scudworth sent him to the kitchen.

The Shadowy Figure 
The Secret Board of Shadowy Figures is a ruthless and secretive government organization who employs Principal Scudworth and is sponsored by Puma. They appear as a parody of the CIA, Secret Service, NSA and Area 51. They were responsible for the creation of the clones in the mid-80's. Their ultimate aim is to use the clones for a super army.

Its chief director is referred to as The Shadowy Figure (voiced by Bill Lawrence). He is aware of Scudworth's craziness and incompetence in running Clone High. Though for the most part, he has shown amnesty as he gave Scudworth numerous times to redeem himself. He finally decides to kill Scudworth and takes the clones away for experimentation after discovering his video tape of his plot to betray the Secret Board of Shadowy Figures and create "Cloney Island". He also secretly hired many celebrities to spy on the clones and Scudworth.

They all wear blue paramilitary uniforms complete with ribbon bars and in the Episode Two are seen wearing Pumas sneakers.

Supporting characters

Clone High students 
 Julius Caesar (voiced by Neil Flynn): Caesar is a good friend of JFK. He is shown to be one of the popular students at Clone High and is very friendly. He speaks in a very old aristocratic and theatrical manner. From one of the quotes on the 2003 MTV website he implies that he is in a relationship with Catherine: "By my troth, Catherine the Great, thou hast playéd with mine heart of stone, and yay, I hath returned but not my pyre" and the two are often seen together. He is also a fan of Laurence Olivier. He always wears a laurel wreath on his head. He appears to have an indifferent personality as shown in Litter Kills Literally as he nonchalantly ate popcorn at Poncey's funeral and did not appear to mourn about his death like the other characters nor did he get shocked after JFK had a mental breakdown at the funeral.
 Catherine the Great (voiced by Murray Miller): a blonde classmate who speaks with a Valley girl dialect. She is best friends with Cleopatra and is one of the popular students. She is implied to be in a relationship with Julius Caesar as they are often together. She has had sex with JFK in which he insults her as "Catherine the so-so". She is shown as being vain, promiscuous and somewhat stupid. She had pursued Gandhi when he was "GFK" (Gandhi with a JFK makeover) but lost interest after he returned to his normal self and went to Winter Prom with JFK alongside The Brontë Sisters and Joan of Arc. In the Series Finale, Catherine and the Brontë Sisters discovers JFK's feelings for Joan and leave them.
 Genghis Khan (voiced by Phil Lord): a friend of Abe and Gandhi. He appears as very friendly but mentally challenged as he is unable to carry out simple tasks. However, he is a skilled opera singer as shown when he sang Ave Maria at Poncey's funeral.
 Marie Antoinette (voiced by Sarah Chalke): A popular student who is a waitress at the Grassy Knoll. She has large breasts which are the source of JFK and Gandhi's boob jokes which she appears to be annoyed by. Her head got chopped off by Winston Churchill's helicopter in Makeover and she is seen carrying her head in her arms at the end of the episode Changes (but strangely enough she was previously seen with it attached to her neck when she was conversing with Tom Green in the background).
 George Washington Carver (voiced by Donald Faison): a science geek who is obsessed with experimenting with peanuts. He created Peanie, an anthropomorphic peanut. He and Gandhi make a blaxploitation-style film called Black and Tan in the episode Film Fest.
 Jesús Cristo (voiced by Jeff Garcia): a Latino version of Jesus Christ. He is often seen in woodshop class, which is an allusion to the real Jesus' career as a carpenter. He was used as a confidant to Joan in A.D.D.: The Last 'D' is for Disorder. He wears a halo on his head. He also appears to be a stoner.
 Adolf Hitler: Appears in one scene in the episode "Film Fest: Tears of a Clone". He appears to have a peace sign on his armband instead of a swastika.
 Vincent van Gogh (voiced by Andy Dick): A mentally disturbed and anti-social young man. He is missing his ear and covers the exposed area with a bandage. He may represent the emo kid. His room is modeled after the impressionist paintings of Van Gogh. Like his clone-father he is a very talented artist as shown when he painted a giant mural to get back at Gandhi.
 Marie Curie (voiced by Nicole Sullivan): a clone who was morbidly deformed due to the exposure to radiation that was in her clone-mother's DNA. She has a very sweet, innocent and nice personality and is very active at school. She is the president of the Solid Gandhi Dancers. She has a major crush on Gandhi as revealed in the episode Makeover, Makeover, Makeover. Gandhi acknowledges his feelings for her at the episode of Makeover, Makeover, Makeover and they became a couple at the end of the episode Changes.
 Thomas Edison (voiced by Andy Dick): He is one of the school nerds and runs the audiovisual club. He has a hunchback and the way he speaks makes him sound congested and having a lisp. He is voiced by Andy Dick.
 Paul Revere (voiced by Zach Braff): the nosy school gossip who he is seen riding a horse while he spreads rumors, he played a major role in the episode A.D.D, as he informed the whole school of Gandhi's condition.
 Nostradamus: He is an overweight, pimply nerd who falsely believes that he can predict anything, he is known for saying he knew something was going to happen after it already did happen. Because of that he is often seen as a nuisance. He is a lover of science fiction and fantasy. He was also seen hanging with Marilyn Monroe at the Grassy Knoll.
 The Elvis Twins: One twin is fit and healthy, representing the younger Elvis during his prime in the 1950s, while the other twin is overweight with an addiction to tranquilizers, representing Elvis during his downfall in the 1970s.
 Isaac Newton: He was originally supposed to be a recurring character, but only appeared in cameos. He is a skateboarder with very long curly hair and wears a baseball cap that covers his eyes.
 Buddy Holly (voiced by Neil Flynn): He plays in a band called Black Box along with Stevie Ray Vaughan and Ritchie Valens (who along with the real Holly, also died in plane crashes). He was originally supposed to a recurring character but only appeared in Plane Crazy in which he offers to let Abe ride in a poorly constructed biplane along with Vaughan, Valens, and half of Lynyrd Skynyrd.
 Sigmund Freud: He seems able to read people's subconsciences. He appears in Film Fest in which he is the only one who is able to see Joan's love for Abe in her film entry albeit he mocks her for it. According to an article JFK wrote for the school newspaper The Tatler, he tells JFK that JFK was repressed because he had two father figures and no mother to subconsciously lust after.
 Napoleon Bonaparte: Member of Clone High basketball team and an assistant manager at T.G.I. Chili's restaurant chain when Abe and Gandhi get after-school jobs. Abe notes that he has some kind of complex.
 William Howard Taft : Member of the Clone High basketball team.
 Ponce de León (voiced by Luke Perry): Referred to as "Poncey", he is a combined parody of Fonzie, Dylan McKay and James Dean. He only appears in the episode Litter Kills Literally alive but makes a cameo in the series finale as a ghost. He was JFK's best friend until they got into an argument. He was violently killed by a freak accident involving litter, where a juice box stabs him in the throat and a plastic bag gets caught on his head, causing him to drown in his own blood. He was very popular and well liked by the other students and he also appeared as optimistic and philosophical which JFK mocked about him. He makes another appearance in that episode as a ghost, but was likely only a hallucination conceived by the grief-stricken JFK

Clone High staff 
 Eleanor Roosevelt: The school's gym teacher. She appears as grotesque and aggressive. She also implies she is a lesbian as she ogled at Joan in the episode Escape from Beer Mountain.
 Mr. Sheepman (voiced by Andy Dick): A kindly history teacher at Clone High, home room teacher for the clones, and the first mostly human clone with a little sheep DNA mixed into his genetic composition (a parody of Dolly the Sheep). His mannerisms are a parody of Don Knotts.

Family 
 Abe's Foster Dad and Abe's Foster Mom: (voiced by Joe Flaherty and Will Forte respectively): They represent a typical conservative suburban couple. They are seen in Raisin the Stakes where they reprimand Abe for smoking raisins and Abe's father is seen in the episode Changes which he encourages Abe to have sex with Cleopatra. Abe's father resembles Harold Weir from the TV series Freaks and Geeks.
 Toots (voiced by Donald Faison): Joan's adoptive grandfather. He is a blind, elderly, likely senile African-American jazz musician who resembles Ray Charles. He is seen with a clarinet most of the time. He has a very down-to-earth personality. He is loving and patient towards his foster granddaughter and gives her advice all the time but he fails to understand why she is so upset. He is possibly a devout Christian as he has a golden Jesus Fish on the trunk of his car. He is in a relationship with Cleo's alcoholic mother.
 Wally and Carl (voiced by Donald Faison and Neil Flynn respectively): JFK's adoptive fathers who he refers to as "Gay Foster Dads". They are a flamboyant, gay, interracial couple who are loving and understanding towards their adopted son despite his mild homophobia. JFK shows low tolerance for them and stresses himself to act as masculine and promiscuous as possible to compensate for their homosexuality. Wally is the African-American effeminate partner and Carl is the Caucasian butch partner.
 Cleo's drunk foster mom (voiced by Nicole Sullivan): Cleo's (and formerly Gandhi's) unnamed adoptive mother. She is a lazy, slurring alcoholic, and is  unemployed and lives off disability checks. She tends to be abusive towards her daughter both physically and verbally. She once threw make-up at Cleo when she ran out of liquor. Her hostility towards Cleo is stemmed from her own jealously as Cleo is everything she is not, being young, popular and attractive. She is in a relationship with Toots and the two are into S&M as it is seen in A Room For One's Clone.
 Gandhi's parents: Gandhi's adopted mother and father are a stereotypical Jewish couple. They want Gandhi to excel in school. Gandhi's Stereotypical Jewish Foster Dad is voiced by Neil Flynn.

Other characters 
 Narrator (voiced by Will Forte): The sarcastic narrator of the show, he tells the audience in the beginning what happened in the previous episode and a preview of the succeeding episode at the end of the show.
 Scangrade ("The Magnificent") (voiced by Judah Miller): An egotistical and boastful robot who is Mr. Butlertron's hated nemesis. He is a giant dated computer grading machine but with arms and legs and a face. Unlike Mr. Butlertron, Scangrade is very primitive as he was manufactured in the 1950s . He appears in Sleep of Faith and though Mr. Butlertron destroyed him at the end of that episode, Scangrade appears in Changes in which he is covered with tape as a repair.
 President Dog: A cute, little stray puppy who is the student body president of Clone High. He randomly appears at the end of Episode Two in the heat of the class election between Abe Lincoln and JFK, all the students immediately but unintentionally voted him as their class president because of his cuteness and Cleopatra even tried to seduce him. Cleo somewhat takes ownership of him and she constantly dotes on him. He was one of the reasons why JFK and Cleo broke up as JFK was annoyed by Cleo putting herself and the dog before him.
 Cop (voiced by Andy Dick): A police officer who makes random appearances in the series notably in episodes Escape from Beer Mountain, Sleep of Faith, Film Fest and Litter Kills Literally.
 Peanie: An anthropomorphic peanut with a monocle created by George Washington Carver. He is kept in a jar and has a fear of being turned into peanut butter. He is a parody of Mr. Peanut.
 Geshy: A strange, colorful and carnivorous creature that was introduced in the episode Shot in the D'arc. He is the mascot for GESH (Genetically Engineered Superhuman High) and is kidnapped by Gandhi and Genghis to gain revenge on GESH. It is revealed that he is a real creature and he and Gandhi form a friendship similar to Elliot and E.T. After Gandhi gives him up it is shown he has an insatiable appetite for flesh and begins eating wild animals and bit off the referee's arm. He makes a cameo appearance in Litter Kills Literally hidden among a group of animals that JFK calls to clean up litter.
 Glenn the Janitor: The janitor of Clone High. He is also the adopted father of Ponce de León. His appearance is based on the Janitor from the TV series Scrubs (which is also produced by Bill Lawrence). In connection to Clone High, in a season 8 episode of Scrubs it was revealed that the Janitor's real name was Glenn Matthews. He is voiced by Neil Flynn, who was famous for playing the Janitor on Scrubs.

Reception 
Clone High is praised for its high character development and strong voice acting. Charles Soloman of the LA Times wrote that, "Will Forte's ingenuous Abraham Lincoln and Nicole Sullivan's resigned Joan of Arc steal the show."

References 

Clone High
Clone High
Depictions of people on television
Clone High